An adenosine receptor agonist is a drug which acts as an agonist of one or more of the adenosine receptors. Examples include the neurotransmitter adenosine, its phosphates, adenosine monophosphate (AMP), adenosine diphosphate (ADP), and adenosine triphosphate (ATP), and the pharmaceutical drug regadenoson.

List of adenosine receptor agonists 

 ATL146e (A2A selective)
 PD81,723 (A1 allosteric enhancer)

See also
 Adenosine receptor antagonist
 Adenosine reuptake inhibitor

References

Drugs acting on the nervous system